The Kitāb al-Bulhān, or Book of Wonders, is a 14th and 15th century Arabic manuscript, compiled by Hassan Esfahani (Abd al-Hasan Al-Isfahani) probably bound during the reign of Jalayirid Sultan Ahmad (1382–1410) in Baghdad. The contents include subjects on astronomy, astrology and geomancy, including a section of full-page illustrations, with plates dedicated to the discourse topic, e.g. a folktale, a sign of the zodiac, a prophet, etc.

Gallery

See also
The Book of Felicity

References

Citations

Sources

Islamic illuminated manuscripts
Astrological texts
14th-century illuminated manuscripts
15th-century illuminated manuscripts
Medieval Arabic literature
Arabian mythology
Arabic grimoires